This is a list of seasons completed by the Georgia Force. The Force are a professional arena football franchise of the Arena Football League (AFL), based in Gwinnett County, Georgia, and plays its home games at the Arena at Gwinnett Center. The original team was established in 1997 as the Nashville Kats, and relocated to Georgia for the 2002 season, but similar to the Baltimore Ravens of the National Football League, who were previously the Cleveland Browns, the Force do not retain the history of the Kats, and are considered an expansion team. The Force found some success in the AFL, winning their division in three out of their final four seasons, but appeared in only one ArenaBowl in their existence, which was a losing effort. Prior to the 2009 season, the AFL announced that it had suspended operations indefinitely and canceled the 2009 season. The Force then announced that they would cease operations permanently.

Prior to the 2011 season, the Force returned to action after it was announced that the Alabama Vipers would assume the history of the franchise after relocating.

References
General
 

Specific

Arena Football League seasons by team
 
Georgia (U.S. state) sports-related lists
Atlanta-related lists